West Miltmore is an unincorporated community in Lake Villa Township, Lake County, Illinois, United States. West Miltmore is located on County Route 18A near the northern border of Round Lake Beach. It is included in the Venetian Village census-designated place.

References

Unincorporated communities in Illinois
Chicago metropolitan area
Unincorporated communities in Lake County, Illinois